Yell Fire! is the fifth studio album by the reggae-influenced band Michael Franti and Spearhead. It was inspired by Michael Franti's trip to the Middle East, visiting Iraq, Israel, and the Palestinian territories. It is a politically charged album, with each track focusing on a controversial issue. The album was recorded in Kingston, Jamaica and San Francisco and released on July 25, 2006 by ANTI- and Liberation Records.

In the album's first week of sales, it had sold 7,215 copies and by March 28, 2007, Yell Fire! had sold 62,755 copies. In the U.S. the album peaked at #125 on the Billboard 200, but also peaked at #6 on Independent Albums and #1 on Heatseeker Albums.

Track listing

Charts

References

External links 
[ Yell Fire! at Allmusic]

2006 albums
Anti- (record label) albums
Michael Franti albums